Cynthia Alejandra de la Vega Oates (born September 28, 1991) is a Mexican beauty queen and the 2010 Nuestra Belleza Mundo México titleholder.

A native of Nuevo León, Cynthia de la Vega was chosen to represent her country in the 61st Miss World pageant in 2011 during the 2010 edition of Nuestra Belleza México, held September 25, 2010 in Saltillo, Coahuila. The pageant was won by Jalisco's Karin Ontiveros. De la Vega was crowned Nuestra Belleza Mundo México by the outgoing titleholder Anabel Solís. She previously won the Elite Model Look contest of Mexico in 2008 and subsequently participated in the international final, held in Sanya, China on November 1 of that year. She was dethroned on July 13, 2011, for not fulfilling functions as the current reigning queen and was replaced by Gabriela Palacio of Aguascalientes.

She is the second national titleholder to be dethroned in the history of Nuestra Belleza México.

References

(Dethroned)

1991 births
Living people
Nuestra Belleza México winners
Beauty pageant contestants from Monterrey
Mexican people of English descent
Miss Supranational contestants